Joe Martin Field is a baseball park in the northwest United States, located in Bellingham, Washington. It was a minor league ballpark in the Class A-Short Season Northwest League for 24 seasons, from 1973 through 1996.

The ballpark hosted three different NWL teams. The Bellingham Dodgers arrived in 1973 and stayed for four seasons. They were replaced in 1977 by the most well-known tenant, the Bellingham Mariners (or "Baby M's"), who played from 1977 through 1994 and gave big-league Mariners fans a glimpse of the future with players like Ken Griffey Jr., Edgar Martínez, Dave Henderson, and Dave Valle. After 18 seasons and four league championships, the Mariners moved their NWL ballclub closer to Seattle at Everett.  The San Francisco Giants brought their affiliate to town where they played for two years (1995–96), then moved south to Oregon and became the Salem-Keizer Volcanoes in 1997.

In 1999, it became the home of the Bellingham Bells of the Pacific International League (PIL). The Bells played in the PIL for six years. In 2005, the team chose to become one of the founding franchises of the West Coast Collegiate Baseball League. Today, the league was later renamed the West Coast League and features some of the finest collegiate players in the country. Each summer the Bells play around 30 home games at Joe Martin Field as part of their WCL schedule which features teams from Washington, Oregon, and British Columbia. In 2014, the natural grass playing surface was replaced with synthetic FieldTurf; the renovation cost about $1.44 million and was completed in March 2015.

The field has an unorthodox southwest alignment (home plate to center field); the recommended alignment is east-northeast, nearly opposite.

People that played at Joe Martin Field

References

External links
Bellingham Bells

Buildings and structures in Bellingham, Washington
1964 establishments in Washington (state)
Baseball venues in Washington (state)